David Neres Campos (born 3 March 1997) is a Brazilian professional footballer who plays as a winger for Portuguese Primeira Liga club Benfica and the Brazil national team.

Neres is a graduate of São Paulo's youth system and was promoted to the first team in 2016. He joined Ajax in January 2017. At Ajax, Neres established himself as one of the best young wingers in Europe, after winning a domestic double and being instrumental part of Ajax's first UEFA Champions League semi-final appearance in 22 years, in a breakthrough 2018–19 season. The following seasons, were marked by continuous injuries resulted in Neres playing a limited amount of games and declining in performances, leading him to move to Ukrainian side Shakhtar Donetsk, and then transferred to Benfica for €15.3 million.

After representing Brazil at various youth levels, Neres was called up to the full international team for the first time in March 2019, and was part of the squad that took part won the 2019 Copa América.

Club career

São Paulo
Born in São Paulo, Neres joined São Paulo's youth setup in September 2007, aged ten. In February 2016, after being regularly used in that year's U-20 Copa Libertadores, he suffered a shoulder injury which kept him sidelined for months.

Neres was promoted to the main squad by manager Ricardo Gomes in August 2016. He made his first team – and Série A debut – on 17 October, coming on as a second-half substitute for Robson in a 2–1 away win against Fluminense.

On 22 October 2016 Neres scored his first goal, netting the last in a 2–0 home win against Ponte Preta. Fourteen days later he scored his second goal, netting the second in a 4–0 home routing of local rival Corinthians.

Ajax
On 30 January 2017, Neres moved to the Dutch club Ajax for a reported fee of €12 million.

2016–2019: Breakthrough and European semi-final
Neres made his debut for Ajax against Heracles Almelo, on 26 February 2017. In that season, he managed to get 3 goals in 8 league matches. He also featured in an Ajax team that went to the UEFA Europa League final that year.

Neres managed to get 14 goals and 13 assists in 32 league matches, making him the most valuable player of Ajax that year, having scored the most goals and assists combined.
Neres himself sees the game against Feyenoord, on 22 October 2017, as his breakthrough, where he racked up three assists in a 4–1 away win.

In his third season, Neres scored his first official European goal against Standard Liège in the second leg of the third qualifying round of the Champions League. In that year, Neres wasn't guaranteed a starting spot up until February. Because of this, there were rumours that Neres wanted to leave. In January, Guangzhou Evergrande made a £36.9 million bid on Neres, but Ajax ultimately refused, because they wanted to keep the team together to win prizes that year and make it far in the UEFA Champions League. In the second leg in the round of 16 of the UEFA Champions League, in a memorable game against Real Madrid, Neres scored the second goal to give Ajax the lead on aggregate, and the Dutch side eventually won a by a margin of 5–3, thus knocking the three-time defending European champions out of the competition.

On 31 March 2019, Neres scored the winning goal and picked up a penalty in the championship clash against PSV, to win 3–1. He also scored an important equaliser against Juventus at home to secure hopes for Ajax's semi-final qualification in the first leg at home.

Neres won his first Eredivisie title as Ajax finished three points ahead of rivals PSV. Neres also won his first KNVB Cup when Ajax won 4–0 against Willem II in the final.

2019–2021: Stagnation and final seasons
Despite reported interest from the likes of Manchester United and Atlético Madrid, Neres signed a new contract with Ajax on 7 August 2019 that runs through 2023. The deal added a further year to his prior deal that was set to expire in 2022.

At the start of the 2020–21 season, Neres came back after his injury. On November 22, he scored his first goal in more than a year. Since Ajax acquired Mohamed Daramy and Steven Berghuis as wingers at the beginning of the season, competition for Neres increased, as a result of which he was often no longer included in the starting lineup.

Shakhtar Donetsk
On 11 January 2022 it was reported that Neres was sold to Ukrainian Premier League side Shakhtar Donetsk for a reported fee of €15 million, which can potentially run up to €17 million with bonuses. On 14 January, Ajax confirmed that the transfer had been completed. On 24 February 2022 following the 2022 Russian invasion of Ukraine, a video was shared online of various Brazilian footballers pleading for help from the Brazilian government to help them flee the country. On 1 March 2022 it was reported that the Brazilian players had successfully made it to Romania, from where they travelled home. UEFA president Aleksander Čeferin was personally involved in helping to facilitate the return to safety.

Benfica
On 20 June 2022, Neres signed a five-year contract with Primeira Liga side Benfica, for a reported fee of €15.3 million. The net cost of the transaction was only €300,000, with both Benfica and Shakhtar settling an agreement for the latter's debt, due to the transfer of compatriot and former teammate Pedrinho, which whom Shakhtar had only paid €3 million of a total of €18 million. 

He made his debut for the club on 2 August, providing two assists to Gonçalo Ramos in the 4–1 home win over Midtjylland in the 1st leg of the 2022–23 UEFA Champions League third qualifying round. On August 23, Neres scored his first goal for the club and provided an assist in the 3–0 home win over Dynamo Kyiv in the 2nd leg of the 2022–23 UEFA Champions League play-off round, helping his side qualify to the tournament. Seven days later, he scored his first Primeira Liga goal in a 3–2 home victory over Paços de Ferreira, reaching six goal contributions in six games.

International career

On 8 March 2019, Neres received his first senior team call-up by coach Tite for the Brazil national football team, replacing an injured Vinícius Júnior, for the friendlies against Panama and the Czech Republic to be held later that month. Neres made his senior team debut against Czech Republic on 26 March 2019, in the 63rd minute as a replacement for Richarlison. In that game, he made an assist and produced a backheel which led to a goal, contributing to two goals in the 3–1 win against Czech Republic.

Personal life
On 12 July 2020, Neres' girlfriend, German model Kira Winona, gave birth to their first child. Their daughter is named Hope Winona Neres.

Career statistics

Club

International

Scores and results list Brazil's goal tally first.

Honours
São Paulo
 U-20 Copa Libertadores: 2016

Ajax
 Eredivisie: 2018–19, 2020–21,  2021–22
 KNVB Cup: 2018–19, 2020–21
 Johan Cruyff Shield: 2019

Brazil
 Copa América: 2019

Individual
 Eredivisie Talent of the Month: October 2017
 Eredivisie Player of the Month: April 2018
 UEFA Champions League Squad of the Season: 2018–19

References

External links

Profile at the S.L. Benfica website

1997 births
Living people
Footballers from São Paulo
Brazilian footballers
Brazil under-20 international footballers
Brazil youth international footballers
Association football forwards
Campeonato Brasileiro Série A players
São Paulo FC players
Eredivisie players
Eerste Divisie players
AFC Ajax players
Jong Ajax players
FC Shakhtar Donetsk players
S.L. Benfica footballers
Primeira Liga players
Brazilian expatriate footballers
Expatriate footballers in the Netherlands
Brazilian expatriate sportspeople in the Netherlands
Expatriate footballers in Ukraine
Brazilian expatriate sportspeople in Ukraine
Brazil international footballers
2019 Copa América players
Copa América-winning players